Fatmir Musaj (born 9 September 1958 in Kavajë) is an Albanian painter who served as Director of Albafilm.

Exhibitions
1992 Personal Exhibition - National Museum of History, Tiranë
2003 Personal Exhibition - National Arts Gallery, Tiranë

References

1958 births
Living people
Painters from Kavajë
Albanian painters